Barnim II ( 1277 – 28 May 1295) was Duke of Pomerania.

Son of Duke Barnim I and his third wife, Mechtild of Brandenburg, Barnim's father died in 1278 when he was still a child. He was titular co-ruler with younger brother Otto I and his much older half-brother Bogislaw IV, in whose hands effective power lay. Protected by his mother, Barnim had no real power until 1294 when he and Otto gained a share in ruling Pomerania.

He was killed the following year, in the Ueckermünder Heide, by an irate husband whose wife he had seduced. He left no children and Pomerania was ruled by Bogislaw and Otto after his death.

See also
List of Pomeranian duchies and dukes
History of Pomerania
Duchy of Pomerania
House of Pomerania

References
  Werner Buchholz (ed.), Deutsche Geschichte im Osten Europas. Pommern. Siedler Verlag, Berlin 1999, 

Dukes of Pomerania
1270s births
1295 deaths